The 2020 South Alabama Jaguars baseball team represented the University of South Alabama in the 2020 NCAA Division I baseball season. The Jaguars played their home games at Eddie Stanky Field and were led by ninth year head coach Mark Calvi.

On March 12, the Sun Belt Conference announced the indefinite suspension of all spring athletics, including baseball, due to the increasing risk of the COVID-19 pandemic.

Preseason

Signing Day Recruits

Sun Belt Conference Coaches Poll
The Sun Belt Conference Coaches Poll was released sometime on January 30, 2020 and the Jaguars were picked to finish first in the East Division and first overall in the Sun Belt.

Preseason All-Sun Belt Team & Honors
Drake Nightengale (USA, Sr, Pitcher)
Zach McCambley (CCU, Jr, Pitcher)
Levi Thomas (TROY, Jr, Pitcher)
Andrew Papp (APP, Sr, Pitcher)
Jack Jumper (ARST, Sr, Pitcher)
Kale Emshoff (LR, RS-Jr, Catcher)
Kaleb DeLatorre (USA, Sr, First Base)
Luke Drumheller (APP, So, Second Base)
Hayden Cantrelle (LA, Jr, Shortstop)
Garrett Scott (LR, RS-Sr, Third Base)
Mason McWhorter (GASO, Sr, Outfielder)
Ethan Wilson (USA, So, Outfielder)
Rigsby Mosley (TROY, Jr, Outfielder)
Will Hollis (TXST, Sr, Designated Hitter)
Andrew Beesley (ULM, Sr, Utility)

Preseason Player of the Year
Ethan Wilson - SO, Outfielder

Preseason Pitcher of the Year
Drake Nightengale - SR, Pitcher

Personnel

Roster

Coaching staff

Schedule and results

{| class="toccolours" width=95% style="clear:both; margin:1.5em auto; text-align:center;"
|-
! colspan=2 style="" | 2020 South Alabama Jaguars Baseball Game Log
|-
! colspan=2 style="" | Regular Season (8-10)
|- valign="top"
|
{| class="wikitable collapsible" style="margin:auto; width:100%; text-align:center; font-size:95%"
! colspan=12 style="padding-left:4em;" | February (6-6)
|-
! Date
! Opponent
! Rank
! Site/Stadium
! Score
! Win
! Loss
! Save
! TV
! Attendance
! Overall Record
! SBC Record
|- align="center" bgcolor=#ddffdd
|Feb. 14 ||  || || Eddie Stanky Field • Mobile, AL || W 1-0 || Lehrmann (1-0) || Cowan (0-1) || None || || 1,207 || 1-0 || 
|- align="center" bgcolor=#ddffdd
|Feb. 15 || Campbell || || Eddie Stanky Field • Mobile, AL || W 12-10 || Arguelles (1-0) || Moore (0-1) || Boswell (1) ||  || 1,186 || 2-0 || 
|- align="center" bgcolor=#ffdddd
|Feb. 15 || Campbell || || Eddie Stanky Field • Mobile, AL || L 3-7 || Westlake (1-0) || Booker (0-1) || None || || 1,186 || 2-1 || 
|- align="center" bgcolor=#ffdddd
|Feb. 18 || at No. 4 Vanderbilt || || Hawkins Field • Nashville, TN || L 0-3 || Leiter (1-0) || Boswell (0-1) || Schultz (1) || SECN+ || 3,033 || 2-2 || 
|- align="center" bgcolor=#ffdddd
|Feb. 19 || at No. 4 Vanderbilt || || Hawkins Field • Nashville, TN || L 0-4 || Smith (1-0) || Yarborough (0-1) || Doolin (1) || SECN+ || 3,058 || 2-3 || 
|-
!colspan=12| South Alabama Invitational
|- align="center" bgcolor=#ffdddd
|Feb. 21 ||  || || Eddie Stanky Field • Mobile, AL || L 6-7 || O'Doherty (1-0) || Lehrmann (1-1) || Wohlbold (1) || || 1,304 || 2-4 || 
|- align="center" bgcolor=#ffdddd
|Feb. 22 || Indiana || || Eddie Stanky Field • Mobile, AL || L 2-4 || Bierman (1-1) || Smith (0-1) || Brown (1) || || 1,318 || 2-5 || 
|- align="center" bgcolor=#ddffdd
|Feb. 22 ||  ||  || Eddie Stanky Field • Mobile, AL || W 6-1 || Booker (1-1) || Seiler (0-2) || Dalton (1) || || 1,318 || 3-5 || 
|- align="center" bgcolor=#ddffdd
|Feb. 23 || Siena ||  || Eddie Stanky Field • Mobile, AL || W 8-2 || Arguelles (2-0) || St. Claire (0-1) || None || || 1,250 || 4-5 ||
|-
!colspan=12|
|- align="center" bgcolor=#ddffdd
|Feb. 25 || New Orleans ||  || Eddie Stanky Field • Mobile, AL || W 5-0 || Boswell (1-1) || DeMayo (1-1) || None || || 1,006 || 5-5 ||
|- align="center" bgcolor=#ddffdd
|Feb. 28 ||  ||  || Eddie Stanky Field • Mobile, AL || W 2-0 || Dalton (1-0) || Lardner (0-2) || Lehrmann (1) || || 1,254 || 6-5 ||
|- align="center" bgcolor=#ffdddd
|Feb. 29 || Gonzaga ||  || Eddie Stanky Field • Mobile, AL || L 3-13 || Jacob (1-1) || Yarborough (0-2) || Hughes (1) || || 1,344 || 6-6 ||
|}
|-
|

|-
|

|-
|

|-
! colspan=2 style="" | Post-Season (0–0)
|-
|

|}Schedule Source:'''
*Rankings are based on the team's current ranking in the D1Baseball poll.

References

South Alabama
 South Alabama Jaguars baseball seasons
South Alabama Jaguars baseball